Elizabeth Tan may refer to:
 Elizabeth Tan (English actress) (born 1990), British actress
 Elizabeth Tan (singer) (born 1993), Malaysian singer, model and actress